They Got Me Covered, also known as Washington Story and The Washington Angle, is a 1943 comedy film directed by David Butler and starring Bob Hope and Dorothy Lamour. Otto Preminger appears in a supporting role.

Plot
In mid 1941, acclaimed Pulitzer Prize-winning newspaper reporter Robert "Kit" Kittredge returns to the U.S. from his position as their Moscow correspondent. He is fired for his incompetency by his editor, Norman Mason, the minute he comes back, since he has neglected to report that Germany recently has invaded Russia.

Kit goes to see his girlfriend, stenographer Christina Hill, at work in another newspaper in Washington,  D.C. Their meeting is stopped when one of Kit's Romanian informers, Gregory Vanescu, claims to have a big scoop for Kit.

Before he can tell Kit his story, he is shot at by Nazi spies and runs into hiding, telling Kit to send Christina to the Lincoln Memorial by midnight that night, wearing a red purse and a green umbrella. To get the required accessories, Christina asks her friend Sally Branch to meet her at the monument by midnight, but by mistake Kit drives Christina to the wrong monument that night.

Sally shows up at the correct memorial and when Vanescu sees her, he believes she is Christina. Sally gets to transcribe the extensive information Vanescu has to offer, which tells of a plan to perform terror attacks on the city by combined German, Italian and Japanese saboteurs. Sally jots down all the information in Christina's monogrammed notebook.

Just as the meeting finishes, Nazi agents appear and steal the notebook. Realizing their mistake, Kit and Christina go to Sally's apartment and waits for her there together with her roommates and her boyfriend, Red, who is a marine.

Sally soon returns and tells the others what happened. Meanwhile, the Nazi agents realize they can't interpret Sally's own system of shorthand. The Nazis come to Sally's apartment and "steal" her away. Christina wants them to call the FBI, but Kit is anxious to get his scoop and his job back, so he only pretends to call them.

Kit goes to look for Vanescu at a nightclub where he knows the man has been hiding before. There he finds a gypsy woman who shows him to a private room on the second floor, where two spies await - Olga and Otto Fauscheim. Olga poses as Vanescu's wife and persuades Kit to help her find her missing husband.

Olga tries to scare Kit off by leading him to an old house of an old delusional Civil War veteran, but Kit strokes the man the right way, and is instead able to discover Vanescu's dead body.

Otto decides they instead try to break Kit by ruining his reputation and career. They manage to drug Kit with a doped cigarette and when he is knocked out makes him marry one of the showgirls, Gloria the Glow Girl, at the night club.

The plan fails, as Christina realizes Kit has been set up. Kit has managed to keep a handkerchief from Olga, and Christina and her friends start tracing the perfume on it. Before Gloria can disclose the plan she was involved in to trick him, she is stabbed and killed by the spies. As she dies, Gloria hands her corsage to Kit. Kit finds the corsage box in Gloria's dressing room and breaks into the flower shop listed on it. In the flower shop, he is slugged by one of the spies.

Kit is quickly suspected of murdering Gloria. Christina finds out that the perfume on the handkerchief was purchased at a particular beauty salon, and she goes there to find clues. The salon is owned by the night club owner, and is next to the flower shop where Kit was headed before he disappeared. Christina suspects them of working with the spies.

It turns out Olga runs the salon, and she recognizes the monogram on Christina's bag, which matches the one on Sally's notebook. Kit is held hostage in another room at the salon, but manages to escape his bonds and run into hiding. By accident he hears the Axis agents speak in the showroom.

Kit hears all about the spy ring's plan to blow up the city. Kit takes on the agents and manage to hold them off until the rest of his friends arrive, including Ted the Marine and his soldier buddies. The spies are defeated and the police arrive. Christina and Kit reunite in a kiss, and his friends discuss the possibility of another Pulitzer Prize because of this new scoop.

Cast
 Bob Hope as Robert Kittredge
 Dorothy Lamour as Christina Hill
 Lenore Aubert as Mrs. Olga Venescu
 Otto Preminger as Otto Feischum
 Eduardo Ciannelli as Baldanacco
 Marion Martin as Gloria
 Donald Meek as Little Old Man
 Phyllis Ruth as Sally
 Philip Ahn as Nichimuro
 Donald MacBride as Mason
 Mary Treen as Helen
 Bettye Avery as Mildred
 Margaret Hayes as Lucille
 Mary Byrne as Laura
 William Yetter Sr. as Holtz (as William Yetter)
 Gino Corrado as Bartender at Cafe (uncredited)
 Bing Crosby as The Music Box (voice) (uncredited)
 Doris Day as Beautiful Girl in Sheet (uncredited)
 Wolfgang Zilzer as Cross (uncredited)

Production
Paramount Pictures loaned their contract stars Bob Hope and Dorothy Lamour to Samuel Goldwyn Productions in exchange for Gary Cooper's appearance in 1942's Star Spangled Rhythm; a film in which Hope and Lamour also appeared. Goldwyn titled the film after Hope's then current best-selling autobiography. According to a September 1942 Hollywood Reporter article, the embassy of neutral Turkey requested that the name of the Axis spies' nightclub be changed from Cafe Istanbul to Cafe Moresque to avoid any connection to Turkey being an Axis power.

Reception
Contemporary reviews were mixed. Bosley Crowther of The New York Times wrote that the film "doesn't quite measure up in plot or speed to some of Mr. Hope's previous excursions in melodramatic farce. It drags in some critical phases, it labors in obvious spots and the climax is too manufactured. But there are side-splitting moments in it and one dandy sequence, at least, in which Bob has a weird conversation with a murderous maniac played by Donald Meek." Variety wrote, "Sometimes it takes and sometimes it doesn't, but 'They Got Me Covered' as a whole is disappointing in light of past Goldwyniana and the talent that went into it ... Hope, in brief, has been shortchanged by the writers and though he succeeds in giving plenty of lift to the film, he hasn't been able to make a 100% solid laugh-fest out of it." Harrison's Reports declared, "Despite a good production, and hard work by the members of the cast, 'They Got Me Covered' never rises much above the level of fair entertainment." David Lardner of The New Yorker wrote that Hope's "gags are of his usual standard, which is reasonably high, and he continues to rattle them off as smoothly as anyone in that line of work."

A half-hour Screen Guild Players radio preview of the film, with Hope and Lamour reprising their roles, aired February 15, 1943, on CBS Radio.

Box office
According to RKO records, RKO lost $150,000 on the film.

References

External links
 
 
 
 

1943 films
American black-and-white films
American spy comedy films
Films about journalists
Films directed by David Butler
Films scored by Leigh Harline
Films set in Washington, D.C.
Films set on the home front during World War II
RKO Pictures films
Samuel Goldwyn Productions films
Films with screenplays by Harry Kurnitz
1940s spy comedy films
World War II films made in wartime
World War II spy films
1943 comedy films
1940s English-language films